Eulaceura manipuriensis, or Tytler's emperor, is an Indomalayan butterfly of the family Nymphalidae. The species was first described by Harry Tytler in 1915. It is endemic to the Indian state of Manipur.

References 

Nymphalidae genera
Butterflies described in 1915